US Post Office-Frankfort is a historic post office building located at Frankfort in Herkimer County, New York, United States. It was built in 1940–1941, and is one of a number of post offices in New York State designed by the Office of the Supervising Architect of the Treasury Department, Louis A. Simon. It is a one-story, five bay, steel frame building on a raised foundation in the Colonial Revival style.  It features a three bay central pavilion surmounted by a slate-covered hipped roof. The interior features a 1942 wood relief by artist Albert Wein titled "Growth."

It was listed on the National Register of Historic Places in 1989.

References

Frankfort
Government buildings completed in 1941
Colonial Revival architecture in New York (state)
Buildings and structures in Herkimer County, New York
National Register of Historic Places in Herkimer County, New York